Tryfon Tolides (born Korifi Voiou, Greece) is a Greek-American poet, author of An Almost Pure Empty Walking (Penguin, 2005). His poems have appeared in literary journals and magazines including America, Atlanta Review, Mwondo Greco, Poetry Daily, Washington Square Review, and Worcester Review. He studied at Boston University, and Tunxis Community College, and graduated from University of Maine with a BFA, and Syracuse University with an MFA. He lives in Farmington, Connecticut.

Honors and awards
 2005 National Poetry Series selection (awarded by his college professor)
 2009 Lannan Foundation Marfa residency

Published works

References

External links
"Author's website"
"Calling", Intalgliodupinblue
"Poet Tryfon Tolides' exclusive interview with Artemis Leontis"
"The Latest Hot Blog Topic", Sturgeon's Law,  March 04, 2009
"Tryfon Tolides makes it big", Philokalia Republic
 "Calling", "The fire is now so sweet", Poet's Choice, Washington Post
 "Immigrant"; "Almond Tree"; "I Will Sleep", Poetry Daily
 "My Father Is At A Kind Of Bus Station", Poetry Bay, FALL 2007
 "The Mouse and the Human", America Magazine, JUNE 7, 2004

Year of birth missing (living people)
Living people
21st-century American poets
University of Maine alumni
Syracuse University alumni
Boston University alumni
Greek emigrants to the United States
Poets from Connecticut
American writers of Greek descent